In the 1982–83 season, Espérance Sportive de Tunis competed in the National 1 for the 28th season, as well as the Tunisian Cup. It was their 28th consecutive season in the top flight of Tunisian football. They competed in National 1, and the Tunisian Cup.

Squad list
Players and squad numbers last updated on 18 November 1982.Note: Flags indicate national team as has been defined under FIFA eligibility rules. Players may hold more than one non-FIFA nationality.

Competitions

Overview

{| class="wikitable" style="text-align: center"
|-
!rowspan=2|Competition
!colspan=8|Record
!rowspan=2|Started round
!rowspan=2|Final position / round
!rowspan=2|First match	
!rowspan=2|Last match
|-
!
!
!
!
!
!
!
!
|-
| National 1

|  
| 3rd
| 26 September 1982
| 29 May 1983
|-
| Tunisian Cup

| Round of 32
| Quarter-final
| 9 January 1983
| 20 March 1983
|-
! Total

National 1

League table

Results by round

Matches

Tunisian Cup

Squad information

Playing statistics

|-
! colspan=10 style=background:#dcdcdc; text-align:center| Goalkeepers

|-
! colspan=10 style=background:#dcdcdc; text-align:center| Defenders

|-
! colspan=10 style=background:#dcdcdc; text-align:center| Midfielders

|-
! colspan=10 style=background:#dcdcdc; text-align:center| Forwards

|-
! colspan=10 style=background:#dcdcdc; text-align:center| Players transferred out during the season

Goalscorers
Includes all competitive matches. The list is sorted alphabetically by surname when total goals are equal.

References

External links
 1982–83 Espérance Sportive de Tunis season at footballvintage.net 

1982-83
Tunisian football clubs 1982–83 season